The 1953–54 season was Stoke City's 47th season in the Football League and the 14th in the Second Division.

During the summer of 1953 Taylor began moving on a number of former favourites as he began at stamp his mark on the club; however, with not much money to spend the squad had a decidedly mid-table look. And so it turned out to be as Stoke were very average and with seventeen draws they finished in eleventh position as Taylor struggled to find his most successful team.

Season review

League
With Stoke now in the Second Division manager Frank Taylor decided to clear out some of the long serving players. Dennis Herod and Leslie Johnston both joined Shrewsbury Town and Jock Kirton left for Bradford City. Taylor and a relatively new board, saw no quick way back into the First Division and there would be no panic buying. Taylor insisted that he would buy if necessary but would be looking to bring players through the youth and reserve ranks at the club.

There was then, a distinct mid-table look about the Stoke City squad as the 1953–54 season got underway and Taylor like so many other managers heard of the impressive young duo at nearby Crewe Alexandra that of Johnny King and Frank Blunstone. In September he made his move for the pair and signed King for £8,000 but could not afford Blunstone who went on to Chelsea. He also signed Scottish pair Bobby Cairns and Joe Hutton to boost his midfield. However, it was very dull season for the supporters as there was seventeen draws during the season with 1–1 being the most popular scoreline. The season's average attendance fell to 18,000, 10,000 down on the previous season. Stoke did however manage to record their highest league away win beating Bury 6–0 on 13 March 1954 at Gigg Lane. However, there was great sadness at the end of the season as in May 1954 former long serving defender and manager Bob McGrory died at the age of 62 just two years after he ended his 31-year association with the club.

FA Cup
After soundly beating Hartlepool United 6–2 in the third round with Frank Bowyer scoring four Stoke lost to Leicester City after a replay.

Final league table

Results

Stoke's score comes first

Legend

Football League Second Division

FA Cup

Squad statistics

References

Stoke City F.C. seasons
Stoke